or  is a Hawaiian word that means 'immense heaven', 'open skies', or 'wide horizons'.

Laniakea or Laniākea may also refer to:
 Laniakea Supercluster, a supercluster of galaxies that includes the Milky Way
 Laniākea, a building in Honolulu, see YWCA Building (Honolulu, Hawaii)
 "Laniakea", the tenth track from the album Mothers by British indie rock band Swim Deep
 Laniākea Beach, a beach in Hawaii, see List of beaches in Hawaii
 "Laniakea Waltz", a 1964 composition from the Lalo Schifrin album Gone with the Wave
 "Laniakea", a 2016 album from the french prog band Mantra

See also